Marco Baroni (born 11 September 1963) is an Italian football manager and former player, who played as a defender. He is current manager of Serie A club Lecce.

Playing career
Baroni started his career with Fiorentina, and reached his football peaks during his time at Napoli, where he played his first seasons as a Serie A regular, winning an Italian championship title (scoring the title-clinching goal on the last day of the season against Lazio) and a Supercoppa Italiana title in 1990. He left Napoli in 1991 to join Bologna, and then left the club due to its financial issues; after a short spell at Serie C2 club Poggibonsi, he then joined Serie B side Ancona, and moved to Verona in 1996, where he enjoyed his last appearances in the Italian top flight. He retired in 2000 after two seasons with hometown Serie C2 club Rondinella.

Coaching career
After his retired from playing football, Baroni was immediately appointed head coach of Rondinella in 2000, and then served with a handful of other Serie C2 clubs such as Montevarchi, Carrarese and F.C. Südtirol. In 2007, he was appointed as new head coach of Serie C1 club Ancona, but failed to complete his season with the biancorossi, and later accepted a youth coach offer from Serie A club Siena. During the 2008–09 season, Baroni guided the Siena Primavera (under-19) team to the Campionato Nazionale Primavera final, which they eventually lost to Palermo.

On 29 October 2009, Siena appointed Baroni as new head coach in order to replace dismissed boss Marco Giampaolo. His reign as first team coach however lasted only three weeks, as he was stripped of his managerial duties on 23 November following a home defeat to Atalanta, with Alberto Malesani being appointed at his place, and Baroni being re-appointed back at his previous role of under-19 team coach.

In June 2010, he was announced as new head coach of Lega Pro Prima Divisione club Cremonese.

In July 2011, he was appointed as youth team coach for Juventus. He left the role in July 2013 to become new head coach of Serie B club Virtus Lanciano. After an impressive start and a less successful end of season with the club ending in tenth place, Baroni and Virtus Lanciano mutually parted ways. He was successively named new head coach of another Serie B team, Pescara, for the 2014–15 season. After a lacklustre season, with Pescara on ninth place and one point out of the promotion playoff zone, Baroni was sacked on 16 May 2015 with one game remaining, being replaced by youth coach Massimo Oddo.

On 23 June, Baroni became the head coach of Novara Calcio. He guided the club to a promotion playoff spot, but was not confirmed by the club for the new season and was successively appointed as new head coach of freshly-promoted Serie B club Benevento. In his first season in charge, he led Benevento to fourth place in the regular season and to ultimately win the promotion playoffs after winning a two-legged final against Carpi, thus bringing the Campanian club to Serie A for its first time ever. He was confirmed as Benevento head coach for the 2017–18 Serie A season. He was sacked on 23 October 2017.

On 19 December 2018, Baroni was appointed the head coach of Frosinone. After Frosinone was relegated from the 2018–19 Serie A season, Baroni's contract was terminated by mutual consent on 2 June 2019.

On 8 October 2019, he was appointed head coach of Serie B club Cremonese. In January 2020 he was however sacked due to poor results.

On 15 December 2020, he was appointed head coach of newly promoted Serie B club Reggina. After guiding Reggina to safety, he left the Calabrians to accept an offer from Serie B promotion hopefuls Lecce for the 2021–22 season. Lecce was promoted to Serie A at the end of the season, and the contract with Baroni was renewed for the 2022–23 season.

Personal life
His son Riccardo Baroni is a professional footballer.

Managerial statistics

Honours

Player
Napoli
Serie A: 1989–90

Manager
Lecce
Serie B: 2021–22

References

Living people
1963 births
Footballers from Florence
Italian footballers
Italy under-21 international footballers
Italian football managers
Association football defenders
Serie A players
Serie B players
Serie C players
Serie D players
Serie A managers
ACF Fiorentina players
A.C. Monza players
Calcio Padova players
Udinese Calcio players
A.S. Roma players
U.S. Lecce players
S.S.C. Napoli players
Bologna F.C. 1909 players
A.C. Ancona players
Hellas Verona F.C. players
A.C. Ancona managers
A.C.N. Siena 1904 managers
Delfino Pescara 1936 managers
F.C. Südtirol managers
Frosinone Calcio managers
U.S. Cremonese managers
S.S. Virtus Lanciano 1924 managers
Reggina 1914 managers
U.S. Lecce managers
Serie B managers
Serie C managers